Mange Makers is a Swedish music group composed of  (stage name Bacall) as video & music producer 2011–2014, Max Christensson as dancer, Max Henriksson as beatbox and Didrik Rastbäck as vocals.

They released their first song "Fest hos Mange" ("Party at Mange's") on YouTube in 2011. The song was created as a joke to surprise Henriksson's and Rastbäck's friend named Mange, who was throwing a party, the group has however not revealed more about who Mange is. The song became a sensation in Sweden, reaching number 9 on the Swedish Singles Chart, topping the iTunes chart, and reaching 9 million views on YouTube. Their Christmas adaptation called "Jul hos mange" also charted on the Swedish Singles Chart, reaching number 26.

Their next single was "Mange bjuder", which peaked at number two on the Swedish Singles Chart. It was followed up by "Drick den".

Discography

Singles

Music videos

Notes

References

External links
 MangeMakers.se
 YouTube channel

Swedish musical groups
Swedish-language singers
Musical groups established in 2011
Internet memes
2011 establishments in Sweden